The Just is an epithet that may refer to:

People
 Aristides (530 BC-468 BC), Athenian statesman
 Casimir II the Just (1138–1194), Duke of Wiślica, Duke of Sandomierz, Duke of Kraków and High Duke of Poland
 Childebert III (670 or probably 683–711), King of the Franks
 Diarmaid the Just (died 542), Irish abbot and saint
 Ferdinand I of Aragon (1380–1416), King of Aragon, Valencia, Majorca, Sardinia and (nominally) Corsica, and King of Sicily
 Harun al-Rashid (763 or 766-809), 5th Caliph of the Abbasid Caliphate, Abbasid Caliph in Ar-Raqqah
 James II of Aragon (1267–1327), King of Sicily (as James I), King of Aragon and Valencia, Count of Barcelona, King of Sardinia and Corsica
 Khosrow I (died 579), also known as Anushiravan the Just, twentieth Sassanid Emperor (Great King) of Persia
 Louis XIII (1601–1643), King of France and Navarre
 Matthias Corvinus (1443–1490), King of Hungary and Croatia, King of Bohemia, and Duke of Austria
 Menander II (fl. 90–85 BC), Indo-Greek ruler
 Peter of Castile (1334–1369), King of Castile and León
 Peter I of Portugal (1320–1367), King of Portugal and the Algarve
 Rev I of Iberia (189–216), King of a Georgian Kingdom of Iberia
 Simeon the Just (fl. 3rd century BCE), a Jewish High Priest during the time of the Second Temple

Biblical or fictional characters
 James, brother of Jesus (died 62 or 69), a figure in early Christianity
 Edmund Pevensie, in C. S. Lewis's The Chronicles of Narnia

Lists of people by epithet